Robin Mathews is a make-up artist.

She won “Best Period and/or Character Makeup - Feature Films” for her work in Dallas Buyers Club, as part of the 2014 Make-Up Artists and Hair Stylists Guild Awards.

She also, along with hairstylist Adruitha Lee, won an Academy Award for Best Makeup and Hairstyling for Dallas Buyers Club.

References

External links

Make-up artists
Year of birth missing (living people)
Living people
Best Makeup Academy Award winners